Jan "Lill-Blöta" Jonsson (born 8 August 1948) is a former Swedish handball player who competed in the 1972 Summer Olympics.

In 1972 he was part of the Swedish team which finished seventh in the Olympic tournament. He played three matches and scored six goals.

References

1948 births
Living people
Swedish male handball players
Olympic handball players of Sweden
Handball players at the 1972 Summer Olympics